The Directorate-General for Migration and Home Affairs (DG HOME) is a Directorate-General of the European Commission. The role of the body is to ensure the EU's security, to build a common EU migration and asylum policy, and to promote dialogue and cooperation with non-EU countries. Thereby, it contributes to the area of freedom, security and justice (AFSJ).

As of 2020, Monique Pariat is the Director-General of the Directorate-General Migration and Home Affairs. There are also three Deputy Directors-General including one who is responsible for "horizontal affairs and migration", currently Johannes Luchner, one in charge of "Schengen & security" acting also at Counter-Terrorism Co-ordinator, currently. Olivier Onidi, and one dealing with "Financial management, situation awareness" who is also heading the Task Force Migration Management, being Beate Gminder.
The Commissioner responsible for Home Affairs under the current Commission is Ylva Johansson, the European Commissioner for Home Affairs.

Structure

Directorate A: Directorate for International and Horizontal Affairs
Directorate B: Schengen, Borders & Innovation
Directorate C: Migration, Asylum and Visa
Directorate D: Internal security
Directorate E: HOME Affairs Funds
Directorate F: Audit and Situational Awareness

Additionally, there are the following Migration and Home Affairs Agencies:

 European Agency for the operational management of large-scale IT systems in the area of freedom, security and justice (eu-LISA)
 FRONTEX, European Border Coast Guard Agency (EBCGA)
 European Union Agency for Asylum (EUAA)
 European Union Agency for Law Enforcement Cooperation (EUROPOL)
 European Union Agency for Law Enforcement Training (CEPOL)
 European Monitoring Centre for Drugs and Drug Addiction (EMCDDA)

Directorate A: Directorate for International and Horizontal Affairs 
This Directorate is made up of four policy coordination units (1) Policy Coordination and Inter-institutional Relations, (2) Communication, (3) International Affairs, and (4) Legal Affairs and Enforcement.

Directorate B: Schengen, Borders & Innovation 
This Directorate is made up of four policy units (1) Schengen and External Borders, (2) Schengen Governance, (3) Information Systems for Borders, Migration and Security, and (4) Innovation and security research.

Directorate C: Migration, Asylum and Visa 
This Directorate is made up of five policy units (1) Irregular Migration and Returns, (2) Legal Pathways and Integration, (3) Asylum, (4) Migration management, and (5) Visa Policy.

Directorate D: Internal security 
This Directorate is made up of five policy units (1) Law Enforcement Cooperation, (2) Counter-Terrorism, (3) Prevention of Radicalisation, (4) Security in the Digital Age, and (5) Organised Crime, Drugs and Corruption.

Directorate E: HOME Affairs Funds 
This Directorate is made up of five financial policy units (1) Funds Programming and Agencies Coordination, (2) South and Central Europe (I), (3)North, West and Central Europe (II), (4) Union actions and Procurement, and (5) Budget and Reporting.

Directorate F: Audit and Situational Awareness 
This Directorate is made up of two units (1) Audit and Compliance and (2) Situational Awareness.

In order to achieve its goals, the European Commission has published several policy agendas. Current major agendas related to the DG HOME are the Security Union Strategy (2020), the European Agenda on Migration (2015), and the Cybersecurity Strategy for the European Union (2013). Other major agendas are the EU Global Strategy (2016), the White Paper on the Future of Europe (2017), the European Energy Security Strategy (2014).

History
DG HOME was created in 2010 when the DG Justice, Freedom and Security was split into DG HOME and the Directorate-General for Justice.

See also
European Civil Service (i.a. for all DGs)
European Commissioner for Home Affairs
European Commissioner for Justice, Fundamental Rights and Citizenship
Directorate-General for Justice and Consumers
Justice and Home Affairs Council (Council of the European Union)
Area of Freedom, Security and Justice
Charter of Fundamental Rights of the European Union
Four Freedoms
European Convention on Human Rights
Universal Declaration of Human Rights
Police and Judicial Co-operation in Criminal Matters

References

External links
DG HOME Website
 organisation chart 
The Commissioners - official homepage
Commissioner for Home Affairs- official homepage

Home Affairs